Studley is a large village and civil parish in the Stratford-on-Avon district of Warwickshire, England. The Roman road of Ryknild Street, now the A435, passes through the village on its eastern edge, parallel to the River Arrow. The name derives from the Old English leah, being a meadow or pasture, where horses, stod, are kept.

The United Kingdom Census 2001 reported Studley's population as being 6,624, decreasing to 5,879 at the 2011 Census.

History 

The manor of Studley is recorded twice in the Domesday Book mostly as part of the lands of William son of Courbucion; who was appointed Sheriff of Warwick soon after 1086; where it reads, "In Ferncombe Hundred in Stodlei (Studley) 4 hides. Land for 11 ploughs. In lordship 2; 3 slaves. 19 villagers with a priest and 12 smallholders have 9 ploughs. A mill at 5s; meadow, 24 acres; a salt house which pays 19 packloads of salt; woodland 1 league long and ½ a league wide. The value was and is 100s. Swein held it freely." 
A further holding is listed as part of the land of William Bonavallet "William holds 1 hide in Stodlei from William. Land for 2 ploughs. In lordship 1 plough. Meadow 4 acres; woodland 3 furlongs long and 2 furlongs wide. Value 10s. Godric held it freely."

It is the site of both a castle, not the 19th-century house called Studley Castle, and the remains of a medieval priory. The Augustinian priory was founded in the 12th century by Peter Corbizun  but was closed at the dissolution under Henry VIII and was used as a source of stone for other local buildings. Nothing remains today apart from the use of the name priory in a few local building names such as Priory Farm, which now much modernised, embodies a few fragmentary portions of a conventual building. A gabled west wall of stone rubble contains the remains of a large 14th-century window. A few medieval sculptured fragments are built on to the walls.

Economy 

Studley is also known for being the site of a sewing needle and surgical needle making industry. This specialisation started when Elizabeth I permitted a number of Huguenot refugees to settle here, bringing this rare craft with them.

From the 19th century, precision-made surgical needles were in demand, and, with advances in manufacturing technology, such was the demand that over 3,000 workers were employed. In 1977 the old factory where needles were made was burnt down, and the production of "Aero" needles moved to a nearby site. The original factory site now contains a supermarket, other retail outlets, and housing. One of the streets in the village is named "Crooks Lane", ostensibly because the crooked needles from the original factory were dumped at the end of this lane, but the road was there before the village had a needle factory.

Governance

Studley is a ward of Stratford on Avon District Council and represented by Councillors Justin kerridge, Conservative and Hazel Wright, Liberal Democrat. Nationally it is part of Stratford-on-Avon (UK Parliament constituency), whose current Member of Parliament is Nadhim Zahawi of the Conservative Party. Prior to Brexit in 2020, it was included in the West Midlands electoral region of the European Parliament.

Geography

Studley is surrounded on the north, east and west by hills rising to about 500 ft. The River Arrow flows across the south-west corner, through flat ground, but the country north and east of the brook is for the most part undulating and well wooded. The main village lies on the west bank of the river, along the Roman Rykneild Way, which is now the A435, Alcester-Birmingham main road. The fact that the church and the site of the castle are about half a mile away on the opposite side of the river indicates that the original settlement was, at some distance from the Roman road. At Washford, half a mile north of Studley village, the main road bears right from the Rykneild Street and continues through the hamlet of Mappleborough Green and up Gorcott Hill, which marks the northern extremity of the parish. The Rykneild Street (which between Washford and Ipsley diverges considerably from its original line) was, until the end of the 18th century, the main road to Birmingham; the present road between Spernall Ash (on the southern boundary of Studley parish) and Digbeth in Birmingham was turnpiked by an Act of 1721.

Notable buildings

The parish church of the Nativity of the Blessed Virgin consists of a chancel, nave, south aisle and west tower. It features a 12th-century north wall and window of Norman date, fine surviving examples of opus spicatum or herringbone masonry, a medieval rood screen, Elizabethan era table and dug out chest, Jacobean era pulpit and brasses and other points of interest.

The survey of the clergy by the puritans in 1586 described the then vicar, Thomas Penford as; "dumbe & vnlearned, a verie aged man, he can scarce reade, yet he hath learning enough for 2 benefices ; for he reapeth the fruite of Studley & Coughton both, he hath of late gotten him a certaine hireling to serue his turne at both places, one Robt. Cathell a seelie Welshman that can scarce reade English distinctlie. The valew of both is better then xx by the yeare".

 Education 

Studley has 3 primary and one secondary school within the Warwickshire Local Education Authority (LEA) area.

 Sports and leisure 

Studley is often noted as having many pubs, 17 within one square mile. 

As well as boasting a number of football teams, including Studley BKL and Studley Juniors, founded a few years ago by Kevin Sanders and Mike Imms, (formed when the Redditch United Youth Teams broke away and were taken on by Studley BKL), the village also gives its name to Studley Musical Theatre and Operatic group which has been going for over 100 years. They perform twice a year, once in April in a spring show, performing Oliver in 2010 and Fiddler on the Roof in April 2011 and a summer concert.

Just outside the village on the Birmingham road is Studley Cricket Club, home to a thriving social and sports club, members of the Birmingham and District Premier League, (top of the regional midlands structure). The club is open all year round with a growing social membership and has relaunched its junior section for 2011.

There is also a large mixed sports and social club in Eldorado Close (Studley Sports & Social Club, commonly known as the Entaco). This is home to a number of football teams across its 2 pitches, as well as being one of the bases of Redditch Entaco Cricket Club. The club also sports a number of tennis courts and a high quality bowling green, whilst the clubhouse boasts a large function room and is the base for a number of other local clubs and charities to hold their meetings alongside its established social memberships.

Notable people

Hannah Hampton, professional association footballer, grew up in the village.
Andy Smith, a former Professional Darts Corporation lives in the village.
Freddie Starr, singer, had a home in Studley.

References

Further reading
Brewin, Alistair, Studley Through Time''. Studley: Brewin Books, 2016 .

External links

Studley Parish Council Website
Photos of Studley and surrounding area on geograph.org.uk

Villages in Warwickshire